Szabolcs Fényes (April 30, 1912 in Nagyvárad – October 12, 1986 in Budapest) was a Hungarian composer of film scores.

Selected filmography
 Romance of Ida (1934)
 Emmy (1934)
 Premiere (1937)
 Istvan Bors (1939)
 Mickey Magnate (1939)
 Gül Baba (1940)
 Sarajevo (1940)
 One Night in Transylvania (1941)
 The Relative of His Excellency (1941)
 The Witness (1969)

Bibliography
 Bingham, Adam. Directory of World Cinema: East Europe. Intellect Books, 2011.

External links

1912 births
1986 deaths
Hungarian film score composers
Male film score composers
People from Oradea
20th-century composers
20th-century Hungarian male musicians